Ursula Kuczynski (15 May 1907 – 7 July 2000), also known as Ruth Werner, Ursula Beurton and Ursula Hamburger, was a German Communist activist who spied for the Soviet Union during the 1930s and 1940s, most famously as the handler of nuclear scientist Klaus Fuchs. She moved to East Germany in 1950 when Fuchs was unmasked, and published a series of books related to her espionage activities, including her bestselling autobiography, Sonjas Rapport.

Sources concerned with her espionage work in the 1930s/40s sometimes use the cover name originally suggested to her in Shanghai by her fellow intelligence operative Richard Sorge: "Sonja", "Sonja Schultz" or, after she moved to Britain, "Sonya".

Life

Early years
Ursula Maria Kuczynski was born in Schöneberg, Berlin, Prussia, German Empire on 15 May 1907, the second of the six children of the economist and demographer Robert René Kuczynski and his wife Berta Kuczynski ( Gradenwitz), a painter. The family was a secular Jewish one. Ursula had four younger sisters: Brigitte (born 1910), Barbara (born 1913), Sabine (born 1919) and Renate (born 1923), and an older brother, Jürgen (born 1904) would later become a historian-economist with a controversial relationship of his own with the espionage community. The children were academically gifted, and the household was prosperous, employing a cook, a gardener, two household servants and a nanny. Ursula grew up in a small villa on the Schlachtensee lake in the Zehlendorf borough in the southwest of Berlin.  When she was eleven she landed a screen role in The House of Three Girls (1918), the cinema version of Das Dreimäderlhaus.

She attended the Lyzeum (secondary school) in Zehlendorf and then, between 1924 and 1926, undertook an apprenticeship as a book dealer. She had already, in 1924, joined the left-leaning Free Employees league (AfA-Bund), and 1924 was also the year in which she joined the Young Communists (KJVD) and Germany's Red Aid (Rote Hilfe). In May 1926, the month of her nineteenth birthday, Ursula Kuczynski joined the Communist Party of Germany.

Librarianship, marriage and politics

In 1926/27 she attended a librarianship academy while working at a lending library. She then took a job at Ullstein Verlag, a large Berlin publishing house. However, she lost this job in 1928 after participating in a May-Day Demonstration and/or on account of her Communist Party membership. Between December 1928 and August 1929 she worked in a New York book shop before returning to Berlin where she married her first husband, Rudolf Hamburger, who was an architect and fellow member of the Communist Party. It was also at this time that she set up the Marxist Workers' Library (MAB) in Berlin.  She headed up the MAB between August 1929 and June 1930.

Espionage

China
With her husband she relocated, in July 1930, to Shanghai where a frenetic construction boom afforded ample opportunities for Hamburger's architectural work. She would remain based in China till 1935. It was here that the couple's son, the Shakespeare scholar Maik Hamburger, was born in February 1931. After they had been in Shanghai for a little more than four months she was introduced by the US journalist Agnes Smedley to another German expatriate, Richard Sorge, outwardly a journalist, who is better remembered as "Ramsai", an active agent of the Soviet Intelligence Directorate (GRU). Sources are vague as to whether the Hamburgers were already working for the GRU before they left Germany for China, but in any case it was after the meeting with Sorge that between 1930 and 1935 "Sonja" (the cover name by which Kuczynski was known in The Service) operated a Russian spy ring under Sorge's direction.

In Autumn 1931 she had to send her son Maik to live with her husband's parents (now relocated from Germany to Czechoslovakia) when she was sent to Moscow where she undertook a seven-month training session before returning to China. There had been a concern that if baby Michael had accompanied her to Moscow he might inadvertently have blown her cover later by blurting out words in Russian. It was also during this period that she mastered various practical aspects of spy-craft. This included radio operator skills that were much prized in the world of espionage:  she learned to build and operate a radio receiver, becoming an exceptionally capable and accurate user of Morse code. Between March and December 1934 she was based in Shenyang in Manchuria which had been under Japanese military occupation since 1931. Here she met the GRU's chief agent who was working under the name "Ernst". Sonja and Ernst had a romance which would result in the birth of her daughter Janina in April 1936. Her husband Rudolf Hamburger generously acknowledged "Nina" as though she were his own daughter. The GRU was nevertheless concerned that the affair with Ernst might lead to the unmasking of both agents, and she was recalled with Rudolf to Moscow in August 1935.

Poland
In September 1935 they were both posted to Poland where, apart from at least one more lengthy visit to Moscow, they would remain till Autumn 1938. The couple lived mostly in the Polish capital Warsaw during this time and carried out espionage to assist underground Polish communists, apart from a three-month mission in the Free City of Danzig in 1936. In the meantime it would later transpire that in 1937 the Soviets awarded her the Order of the Red Banner for her espionage work in China. Without ever wearing a uniform, she now held the rank of colonel in the Soviet military.

Switzerland
Between Autumn 1938 and December 1940, as agent "Sonja Schultz", she was based, still with her husband Rudolf Hamburger, in Switzerland where she was one of the so-called "red three", together with Sándor Radó:  her duties included working as a specialist radio operator, applying technical skills acquired during her Moscow visits earlier in the decade. The codes she used to send information to Moscow from her little house in Caux, a three-hour walk up into the mountains above Montreux, have never been deciphered. In Switzerland, which was where her marriage with Rudolf Hamburger finally broke apart, she collaborated with the Lucy spy ring and was involved in recruiting agents to be infiltrated into Germany. After the Nazi take-over of Danzig in Autumn 1939 she also set up a resistance group in the formerly free city.

England
She divorced later that same year, and early in 1940, while still in Switzerland, married her second husband. Len Beurton, like her, was working for the Soviet GRU, and like Kuczynski he came with an unusually wide range of names. He also came with a British passport, and by marrying him Agent Sonya automatically acquired a British passport too. Sent by the GRU she and her new husband now relocated from Switzerland to England where she would remain for the rest of the 1940s, and where her second son was born in the late summer of 1943. They had settled in north Oxford, but soon moved on to the first of a succession of nearby villages, settling initially in Glympton, and then in Kidlington. In May 1945 the Beurtons relocated again, to a larger house in the north Oxfordshire village of Great Rollright where they remained until 1949-50, becoming so integrated into the village community that both her parents, who were frequent visitors in Oxfordshire even after the war ended, and who both died in 1947, are buried in the Great Rollright churchyard. In each Oxfordshire property in which she lived Agent Sonya installed a radio receiver and transmitter (which during the war was illegal). Living in Oxfordshire placed them conveniently close to her parents who had emigrated to London after 1933, and were then living with friends in Oxford because of the air raids in London.

The Beurtons' Oxfordshire village homes were also close to the UK's Atomic Research Centre at Harwell, and to Blenheim Palace, where a large part of the British intelligence service had been relocated at the start of the war. In Oxfordshire, together with Erich Henschke, she worked on infiltrating German Communist exiles into the US Intelligence Agency. By Autumn 1944 she and Henschke had succeeded in penetrating UK activities of the US Intelligence Service (OSS). The Americans were at this time preparing "Operation Hammer" for parachuting UK-based German exiles into Germany. Ursula Beurton was able to ensure that a substantial number of the parachuted OSS agents would be reliable communists, able and willing to make inside intelligence from the "Third Reich" available not merely to the US military in Washington, but also to Moscow.

From 1943 she also worked as a courier for the USSR's "Atomic spies", Klaus Fuchs and Melita Norwood. Agent Sonya thus hastened the development of the Soviet atomic bomb, successfully tested in 1949. In addition to the (retrospectively) high-profile spies Klaus Fuchs and Melita Norwood, Sonya was the GRU handler for (among others) an officer of the British Royal Air Force and a British specialist in submarine radar. She was also able to pass to her Soviet employers information from her brother, her father, and other exiled Germans in England. It was, indeed, her brother Jürgen Kuczynski, an internationally respected economist, who originally recruited Fuchs to spy for the Soviets at the end of 1942.

Many years later Ruth Werner (as she would by that time have become known) recalled that she was twice visited by MI5 representatives in 1947, and asked about her links with Soviet intelligence, which Werner refused to discuss. Werner's communist sympathies were no secret, but it seems that British suspicions were insufficiently supported by evidence to justify her arrest. Her visitors were unaware of or unconcerned by her periodic, and apparently casual, meetings with Fuchs in Nethercote, Banbury or on country cycle rides. At that time the British intelligence services seem to have been disinclined to follow up their concerns. Two years later detonation of the first Soviet atomic bomb refocused priorities within MI5, however. Fuchs was arrested towards the end of 1949; in January 1950 he was put on trial and confessed that he was a spy. The day before his trial started, fearing that she was about to be unmasked, Agent Sonya left England. In March 1950, after two decades away from the city of her birth, she turned up back in Berlin. Meanwhile, Fuchs finally identified her as his Soviet contact in November 1950. The espionage-related aspects of her friendship with Melita Norwood only began to emerge several decades later.

Back in the GDR
Germany had changed. Ursula Beurton returned to East Berlin, in what had been the Soviet occupation zone and was now becoming the German Democratic Republic, in October 1949. A systematic nation building process had been underway for several years before 1949, starting with the arrival from Moscow of 30 well prepared formerly exiled German communists in Berlin at the start of May 1945, led by Walter Ulbricht. The Communist Party of Germany had been merged in April 1946 with the East German elements of the Social Democratic Party (SPD), to form the Socialist Unity Party of Germany (SED / Sozialistische Einheitspartei Deutschlands). On her arrival in East Berlin, Beurton joined the SED. She also resigned from the GRU. After undertaking journalism and other writing work, she became an author. In 1950, she was appointed head of the Capitalist Countries Division in the Central Department of Foreign Information in the Government Information Office. She was later fired, reportedly because she forgot to lock a safe door. Between 1953 and 1956 she worked in the Chamber of Commerce for foreign trade.
 Some published works
as Ursula Beurton:
 Immer unterwegs. Reportage aus Prag über die Tätigkeit unserer Ingenieure im Ausland. Verlag Die Wirtschaft: Berlin 1956

as Ruth Werner:
 Ein ungewöhnliches Mädchen. Verlag Neues Leben: Berlin 1958
 Olga Benario. Die Geschichte eines tapferen Lebens. Verlag Neues Leben: Berlin 1961
 Über hundert Berge. Verlag Neues Leben: Berlin 1965
 Ein Sommertag. Verlag Neues Leben: Berlin 1966
 In der Klinik. Verlag Neues Leben: Berlin 1968
 Muhme Mehle. Neuauflage: Spotless: Berlin 2000
 Kleine Fische – Große Fische. Publizistik aus zwei Jahrzehnten. Verlag Neues Leben: Berlin 1972
 Die gepanzerte Doris. Kinderbuchverlag: Berlin 1973
 Ein sommerwarmer Februar. Kinderbuchverlag: Berlin 1973
 Der Gong des Porzellanhändlers. Verlag Neues Leben: Berlin 1976
 Vaters liebes gutes Bein. Kinderbuchverlag: Berlin 1977
 Gedanken auf dem Fahrrad. Verlag Neues Leben: Berlin 1980
 Kurgespräche. Verlag Neues Leben: Berlin 1988
 Sonjas Rapport. (autobiografical) First "complete" German language edition, Verlag Neues Leben (Eulenspiegel Verlagsgruppe) 2006 (original "censored" edition 1977),

The writer
Her short (64 page) publication "Immer unterwegs. Reportage aus Prag über die Tätigkeit unserer Ingenieure im Ausland" was published under the name "Ursula Beurton" in Berlin in 1956.

Between 1958 and 1988, she produced a succession of books under the name by which she subsequently came to be known, Ruth Werner.  Most were story books for children or suitably expurgated memoirs of her time in espionage.  Her autobiography appeared in East Germany under the title "Sonjas Rapport" (Sonya's Report) and became a bestseller. There was no mention of Klaus Fuchs, who was still alive in 1976 and, presumably for the same reason, no mention of Melita Norwood. An English language version appeared in 1991 and a Chinese translation in 1999. An uncensored German language version came out only in 2006, although many questions were still left unanswered.

In 1982 Ruth Werner became a member of the East German affiliate of PEN International.

Die Wende
As the existence of the German Democratic Republic came to an end in the late 1980s, Ruth Werner was one of the few to defend it.  On 10 November 1989, immediately after The Wall was breached, she addressed tens of thousands of people at a meeting in the Berlin Lustgarten (pleasure park) on the subject of her faith in Socialism with a human face. During the run-up to German reunification, she placed great faith in Egon Krenz, who briefly led East Germany. 

She seems never to have regretted or seen the need to apologize for her espionage. In 1956, when Nikita Khrushchev made public the darker face of Communist Russia under Stalin, she was invited to comment. She was reluctant to join the criticism of the Soviet wartime leader:

She died in Berlin on 7 July 2000. Interviewed that year, a few months before her death, she was asked about the consequences of "Die Wende", the changes which had led to German reunification (which many of her persuasion still saw as a peaceful annexation of East Germany by West Germany):

Evaluation
Since 1989 more information has become available concerning at least some of her espionage achievements, and appreciation of Ruth Werner's exceptional abilities has grown. In the opinion of one historian who has studied her career, she was "one of the top spies ever produced by the Soviet Union and her penetration of Britain's secrets and MI5 possibly went far deeper than was thought at the time she was operational." An unidentified GRU chief is reported to have observed during the war, "If we had five Sonyas in England, the war would end sooner." Werner herself could be more reticent about her contribution: "I was simply working as a messenger" ("Ich arbeitete ja bloß als Kurier.")

What is incontrovertible is that she engaged in an exceptionally high-risk trade on behalf of Stalin's Intelligence machine without being shot by the enemy or sent to the Gulag by her own side. Her first husband, the father of her first son, Rudolf Hamburger, who also worked for Soviet intelligence, fell foul of the Soviet regime in 1943 and was deported to the Gulag in the east of the Soviet Union. He was released in 1952 but remained officially "banned" and was sent to Ukraine, only being permitted to return to Germany in 1955. This type of experience was far from unusual among Soviet spies. Sandór Radó with whom she had worked so closely in the hills above Geneva also spent long years as a guest of the Russian Gulag. Richard Sorge, who probably recruited her to work for Moscow in the first place, was caught and hanged by the Japanese. As far as her story has come into the public domain, Werner suffered nothing more harrowing than a couple of pointed but ultimately inconclusive meetings with British Intelligence agents in 1947. She was able to escape to East Germany before her espionage activities became the subject of any trial or other retributive process. Simple survival represented a considerable achievement under the circumstances of her two decades in espionage, and seems to justify the media epithets she attracted to the effect that she was "Stalin's best female spy" ("Stalins beste Spionin").

Notes

References

External links
 Lipman, Maria Review of Agent Sonya: Moscow's Most Daring Wartime Spy by Ben Macintyre, in Foreign Affairs, vol. 99, no. 6 (November / December 2020), p. 183.
 Marton, Kathy Review of Agent Sonya: Moscow's Most Daring Wartime Spy by Ben Macintyre  in New York Times, 15 September 2020
 BBC Radio 4 featured Agent Sonya: Moscow's Most Daring Wartime Spy by Ben Macintyre as a Book of the Week.
 The Spy Museum, 2007
 The Spy who stole the Atom Bomb, 2016 

1907 births
2000 deaths
Writers from Berlin
20th-century German Jews
Communist Party of Germany politicians
Socialist Unity Party of Germany politicians
Party of Democratic Socialism (Germany) politicians
Red Orchestra (espionage)
Soviet spies
German spies for the Soviet Union
Jewish Chinese history
German expatriates in China
World War II spies for the Soviet Union
Women in World War II
East German writers
East German women
Women spies